Pilocrocis laralis is a moth in the family Crambidae. It was described by George Hampson in 1909. It is found in Uganda.

References

Endemic fauna of Uganda
Pilocrocis
Moths described in 1909
Moths of Africa